José Isabel Jiménez (April 19, 1915 – January 20, 2014) was a Mexican baseball journalist, author and broadcaster. His nickname was "Chabelo".

He was the official broadcaster of the Sultanes de Monterrey for many years. He authored numerous books, including Mecanismo de una crónica de beisbol and Oración del Beisbolista.

He was elected to the Mexican Baseball Hall of Fame in 2006.

Personal life
He was born in Pinos, Zacatecas and died at 98 in Monterrey.

References

1915 births
2014 deaths
Male journalists
Mexican Baseball Hall of Fame inductees
Mexican journalists